The 26th Infantry Division was an infantry division of the United States Army. A major formation of the Massachusetts Army National Guard, it was based in Boston, Massachusetts for most of its history. Today, the division's heritage is carried on by the 26th Maneuver Enhancement Brigade.

Formed on 18 July 1917 and activated 22 August 1917 at Camp Edwards, MA, consisting of units from the New England area, the division's commander selected the nickname "Yankee Division" to highlight the division's geographic makeup. Sent to Europe in World War I as part of the American Expeditionary Forces, the division saw extensive combat in France. Sent to Europe once again for World War II, the division again fought through France, advancing into Germany and liberating the Gusen concentration camp before the end of the war.

Following the end of World War II, the division remained as an active command in the National Guard, gradually expanding its command to contain units from other divisions which had been consolidated. However, the division was never called up to support any major contingencies or see major combat, and was eventually deactivated in 1993, reorganized as a brigade under the 29th Infantry Division.

History

World War I

Organization
The 26th Infantry Division was first constituted on 18 July 1917, three months after the American entry into World War I, as the 26th Division. It was formally activated on 22 August of that year in Boston, Massachusetts, and it was celebrated by Boston writers and by composers in pieces such as "The Yankee Division March" and "Battery A March."  Shortly thereafter, the division commander, Major General C. R. Edwards, called a press conference to determine a nickname for the newly formed division. Edwards decided to settle on the suggestion of "Yankee Division" since all of the subordinate units of the division were from the New England states of Maine, Massachusetts, New Hampshire, Rhode Island, and Vermont. Shortly thereafter, the division approved a shoulder sleeve insignia with a "YD" monogram to reflect this.

Order of battle
 Headquarters, 26th Division
 51st Infantry Brigade
 101st Infantry Regiment (9th Massachusetts Infantry, 175 men from 6th Massachusetts Infantry, and 1,400 men from 5th Massachusetts Infantry)
 102nd Infantry Regiment (2nd Connecticut Infantry, 1,617 men from 1st Connecticut Infantry, 50 men from 1st Vermont Infantry, and 100 men from 6th Massachusetts Infantry)
 102nd Machine Gun Battalion (Squadron, Massachusetts Cavalry less Troop B, and 216 men from 1st Vermont Infantry)
 52nd Infantry Brigade
 103rd Infantry Regiment (2nd Maine Infantry 1,630 men from 1st New Hampshire Infantry, and detachments from Companies F, H, K, and M, 8th Massachusetts Infantry)
 104th Infantry Regiment (812 men from 6th Massachusetts Infantry, 812 men from 8th Massachusetts Infantry, 2nd Massachusetts Infantry, and detachments from Companies F, H, K, and M, 8th Massachusetts Infantry)
 103rd Machine Gun Battalion (Squadron, Rhode Island Cavalry less Troops B and M, Separate Machine Gun Troop, New Hampshire Cavalry, 232 men from 1st Vermont Infantry)
 51st Field Artillery Brigade
 101st Field Artillery Regiment (75 mm) (1st Massachusetts F.A. and 180 men from New England Coast Artillery)
 102nd Field Artillery Regiment (75 mm) (2nd Massachusetts F.A. and 150 men from New England Coast Artillery)
 103rd Field Artillery Regiment (155 mm) (Battery A, New Hampshire F.A., three batteries Rhode Island F.A., two batteries Connecticut F.A., Troop M, Rhode Island Squadron of Cavalry, and detachment from New England Coast Artillery)
101st Trench Mortar Battery (detachments of 1st Maine F.A.)
 101st Machine Gun Battalion (Squadron, Connecticut Cavalry and 196 men from 1st Vermont Infantry)
 101st Engineer Regiment (1st Massachusetts Engineers, 100 men from 1st Maine F.A., 479 men from New England Coast Artillery)
 101st Field Signal Battalion (1st Massachusetts Field Signal Battalion)
 Headquarters Troop, 26th Division (Troop B, Massachusetts Cavalry)
 101st Train Headquarters and Military Police (326 men from 6th Massachusetts Infantry)
 101st Ammunition Train (713 men from 1st Vermont Infantry, 240 men from Massachusetts Coast Artillery)
 101st Supply Train (Troop B, Rhode Island Cavalry, 364 men from 8th Massachusetts Infantry, and 62 men from Company M, 6th Massachusetts Infantry)
 101st Engineer Train (82 men from 6th Massachusetts Infantry)
 101st Sanitary Train
 101st, 102nd, 103rd, and 104th Ambulance Companies and Field Hospitals (1st and 2nd Massachusetts Ambulance Companies, 1st and 2nd Massachusetts Field Hospitals, 1st Connecticut Field Hospital, 1st Rhode Island Ambulance Company, 1st New Hampshire Field Hospital)

Overseas
On 21 September 1917, the division arrived at Saint-Nazaire, France. It was the second division of the American Expeditionary Forces (AEF) to arrive on the Western Front at the time, and the first division wholly organized in the United States, joining the 1st Division, which had arrived in June. Two additional divisions completed the first wave of American troop deployment, with the 2nd Division being formed in France and the 42nd Division arriving at St. Nazaire on 29 October. The 26th Division immediately moved to Neufchâteau for training, as most of the division's soldiers were raw recruits, new to military service. Because of this, much of the division's force was trained by the experienced French forces. It trained extensively with the other three US divisions, organized as the U.S. I Corps in January 1918, before being moved into a quiet sector of the trenches in February.

The 26th Infantry Division remained in a relatively quiet region of the lines along the Chemin des Dames for several months before it relieved the 1st Division near Saint-Mihiel on 3 April. The line here taken over extended from the vicinity of Apremont, on the west, in front of Xivray-Marvoisin, Seicheprey, and Bois de Remieres, as far as the Bois de Jury, on the right, where the French line joined the American line. Division Headquarters were at Boucq.

The stay of the division in this sector was marked by several serious encounters with the enemy, where considerable forces were engaged. There were furthermore almost nightly encounters between patrols or ambush parties, and the harassing fire of the artillery on both sides was very active.

On 10, 12 and 13 April, the lines held by the 104th Infantry in Bois Brule (near Apremont), and by the French to the left, were heavily attacked by the Germans. At first the enemy secured a foothold in some advanced trenches which were not strongly held, but sturdy counterattacks succeeded in driving the enemy out with serious losses, and the line was entirely re-established.

In late April, German infantry conducted a raid on positions of the 26th Division, one of the first attacks on Americans during the war. At 0400 on 20 April, German field artillery bombarded the 102nd Infantry's positions near Seicheprey before German Stormtroopers moved against the village. The artillery box barrage, continuing 36 hours, isolated American units. The Germans overwhelmed a machine gun company and two infantry companies of the 102nd and temporarily breached the trenches before elements of the division rallied and recaptured the village. The Germans withdrew before the division could counterattack but inflicted 634 casualties, including 80 killed, 424 wounded, and 130 captured, while losing over 600 men, including 150 killed of their own. Similar raids struck the 101st infantry at Flirey on 27 May, and the 103rd Infantry at Xivray-et-Marvoisin on 16 June, but were repulsed. The 26th Division was relieved by the 82nd Division on 28 June, moved by train to Meaux, and entered the line again northwest of Chateau Thierry, relieving the 2nd Division on 5 July.

As the size of the AEF grew, the division was placed under command of I Corps in July. When the Aisne-Marne campaign began shortly thereafter, the division, under I Corps was placed under command of the French Sixth Army protecting its east flank. When the offensive began, the division advanced up the spine of the Marne salient for several weeks, pushing through Belleau Wood, moving 10 miles from 18 to 25 July. On 12 August it was pulled from the lines near Toul to prepare for the next offensive. The division was then a part of the offensive at Saint-Mihiel, during the Battle of Saint-Mihiel. The division then moved in position for the last major offensive of the war, at Meuse-Argonne. This campaign was the last of the war, as an armistice was signed shortly thereafter. During World War I the 26th Division spent 210 days in combat, and suffered 1,587 killed in action and 12,077 wounded in action. The division returned to the United States and was demobilized on 3 May 1919 at Camp Devens, Massachusetts.

Between the wars
In the years following World War I, the division remained in the National Guard and was reorganized as an all-Massachusetts outfit; many of its subordinate units were reassigned to the 43rd Infantry Division, a new unit containing troops from Connecticut, Maine, Rhode Island, and Vermont. In 1921, the 102nd Infantry Regiment, from Connecticut, was replaced by the 182nd Infantry Regiment. In 1923, the 103rd Infantry Regiment, from Maine, was replaced with the 181st Infantry.

At some point the 26th Infantry Division moved to Plattsburgh, New York and occupied what would eventually become Plattsburgh Air Force Base, a significant Strategic Air Command base for the duration of the cold war with the USSR. The Division deployed to World War II from Plattsburgh, NY.

World War II

Order of battle

The 26th Division was available to the Eastern Defense Command (EDC) from December 1941 through early 1942 for mobile defense; the 104th Infantry remained on this duty through January 1943.

As a part of an army-wide reorganization, the division's two brigade headquarters that controlled four regiments between them were disbanded in favor of a structure containing three separate regimental commands; the division was reorganized under the "triangular" structure and redesignated as the 26th Infantry Division on 12 February 1942. On 14 January 1942, the 182nd Infantry Regiment was sent to New Caledonia to help form the Americal Division, while on 27 January 1942, the 181st Infantry Regiment was relieved from the 26th Division and reassigned to the Eastern Defense Command.  On 27 January 1943, the 328th Infantry Regiment was assigned to the 26th Infantry Division to replace its two lost regiments.

 Headquarters, 26th Infantry Division
 101st Infantry Regiment
 104th Infantry Regiment
 328th Infantry Regiment
 Headquarters and Headquarters Battery, 26th Infantry Division Artillery 
 101st Field Artillery Battalion (105 mm)
 102nd Field Artillery Battalion (105 mm)
 180th Field Artillery Battalion (155 mm)
 263rd Field Artillery Battalion (105 mm)
 101st Engineer Combat Battalion
 114th Medical Battalion
 26th Cavalry Reconnaissance Troop (Mechanized)
 Headquarters, Special Troops, 26th Infantry Division
 Headquarters Company, 26th Infantry Division
 726th Ordnance Light Maintenance Company
 26th Quartermaster Company
 39th Signal Company
 Military Police Platoon
 Band
 26th Counterintelligence Corps Detachment

In August 1943, Major General Willard Stewart Paul took command of the division, which he would lead through the rest of the war. Before deploying overseas to the European Theater of Operations (ETO), the 26th Infantry Division trained at Camp Campbell, Kentucky, and prepared to depart for the Western Front in late August 1944.

Overseas

The division was assigned to III Corps of the U.S. Ninth Army, under Lieutenant General William Hood Simpson, part of the 12th Army Group, commanded by Lieutenant General Omar Bradley. It was shipped from the United States directly to France, and was not sent through Britain. The 26th ID landed in France at Cherbourg and Utah Beach on 7 September 1944, but did not enter combat as a division until a month later. Elements were on patrol duty along the coast from Carteret to Siouville from 13 to 30 September. The 328th Infantry saw action with the 80th Infantry Division from 5 to 15 October. The division was then reassigned to XII Corps of Lieutenant General George S. Patton's U.S. Third Army. On 7 October, the 26th relieved the 4th Armored Division in the Salonnes-Moncourt-Canal du Rhine au Marne sector, and maintained defensive positions. The division launched a limited objective attack on 22 October, in the Moncourt woods. On 8 November, the 26th then went on the offensive, along with first all Black tank Battalion, the 761st, who spearheaded the assault, the 26th Division took Dieuze on 20 November, advanced across the Saar River to Saar Union, and captured it on 2 December, after house-to-house fighting. Reaching Maginot fortifications on 5 December, it regrouped, entering Saareguemines on 8 December. Around this time it was reassigned to III Corps.

Rest at Metz was interrupted by the German offensive in the Ardennes, the Battle of the Bulge. The division moved north to Luxembourg from 19 to 21 December, to take part in the battle of the Ardennes break-through. It attacked at Rambrouch and Grosbous on 22 December, beat off strong German counterattacks, captured Arsdorf on Christmas Day after heavy fighting, attacked toward the Wiltz River, but was forced to withdraw in the face of determined German resistance. After regrouping on 5–8 January 1945, it attacked again, crossing the Wiltz River on 20 January. The division continued its advance, taking Grummelscheid on 21 January, and crossed the Clerf River on 24 January. The division was reassigned to XX Corps. The division immediately shifted to the east bank of the Saar, and maintained defensive positions in the Saarlautern area from 29 January until 6 March 1945.

The division's drive to the Rhine River jumped off on 13 March 1945, and carried the division through Merzig from 17 March, to the Rhine by 21 March, and across the Rhine at Oppenheim on 25–26 March. The division was then reassigned to XII Corps. It took part in the house-to-house reduction of Hanau on 28 March, broke out of the Main River bridgehead, drove through Fulda on 1 April, and helped reduce Meiningen on 5 April. Moving southeast into Austria, the division assisted in the capture of Linz, 5 May. It had changed the direction of its advance, and was moving northeast into Czechoslovakia, across the Vltava River, when the cease-fire order was received. One day later, the division overran the Gusen concentration camp in conjunction with the 11th Armored Division, liberating it from German forces. There, it discovered that the Germans had used forced labor to carve out an elaborate tunnel system with underground aircraft production facilities. SS officers at the camp allegedly planned to demolish the tunnels with the prisoners inside, but the movement of the 26th Infantry and 11th Armored Divisions prevented this.

Casualties
Total battle casualties: 10,701
Killed in action: 1,850
Wounded in action: 7,886
Missing in action: 159
Prisoner of war: 806

Post-war

The 26th Infantry Division received one Distinguished Unit Citation (3rd Battalion, 101st Infantry Regiment, 18–21 November 1944; WD GO 109, 1945). Soldiers were awarded two Medals of Honor, 38 Distinguished Service Crosses, seven Legions of Merit, 927 Silver Stars, 42 Soldier's Medals, 5,331 Bronze Star Medals, and 98 Air Medals. The division returned to the United States and inactivated at Camp Myles Standish, Massachusetts on 21 December 1945.

Cold War 
The division was reactivated on 11 April 1947 in Boston. It remained as the major command of the Massachusetts Army National Guard, but its command took control of units from other states following consolidation of the Army National Guard. The division remained as an active reserve component of the Army National Guard, but it was not selected for any deployments to cold war contingencies. In 1956 the division received its distinctive unit insignia.

The division was reorganized in accordance with the Pentomic organization, probably in 1959. The five infantry battle groups of the division were the 1st Battle Group, 101st Infantry, 1 Btl Gp-104th Inf, 1 Btl Gp-181st Inf, 1st Battle Group, 182nd Infantry, and 1st Battle Group, 220th Infantry. The 104th Infantry Regiment was reorganized on 1 May 1959 under the Combat Arms Regimental System as the 1st Battle Group, 104th Infantry.

In 1963, the division was reorganized under the Reorganization Objective Army Division plan. Its regimental commands were inactivated in favor of brigades. The 101st Infantry Regiment became the 1st Brigade, 26th Infantry Division, headquartered in Dorchester, Massachusetts. The 104th Infantry Regiment became the 3rd Brigade, 26th Infantry Division, headquartered in Springfield, Massachusetts. Among the division's units in 1965 were the 1-101 infantry, 1–104, 2–104, 1–181, 1–182, 1-220 Infantry, and 1-101 FA. The division was organized as a light infantry division, and at the same time, the 26th Aviation Battalion was established to provide air support. In 1967 the 43rd Infantry Division of the Connecticut Army National Guard was consolidated into the 43rd Brigade, 26th Division, and put under the command of the 26th Infantry Division.

In 1987, the 26th Aviation Battalion was dissolved and the 126th Aviation Regiment arose in its place. The 126th Aviation Regiment's battalions formed the basis of the new divisional 26th Aviation Brigade. In 1988, the 3rd Brigade comprised the 1st and 2nd Battalions, 104th Infantry Regiment and the 1st Battalions of the 181st and 182nd Infantry Regiments.

On 1 April 1988, the division was relocated to Camp Edwards, Massachusetts. The division headquarters was consolidated with 1st Brigade, 26th Infantry Division. In its place, the 86th Infantry Brigade was assigned to the division as a round-out unit.

Inactivation 

Prior to the end of the Cold War, the Army reactivated the 29th Infantry Division in 1985. The end of the Cold War led to the Army reorganizing its forces and further consolidating them. As a result, the Army decided to downsize the 26th Infantry Division into a brigade, and put it under the command of the 29th Infantry Division. On 1 September 1993, the division was inactivated, and the 26th Infantry Brigade designated in its place, based in Springfield. The 3d and 43rd brigades, 26th Infantry Division were inactivated, and the 86th Infantry Brigade was put under the command of the 42nd Infantry Division. On 1 October 1995, the division was formally designated the 26th Brigade, 29th Infantry Division. In 2004, the 26th Brigade transitioned into the 26th (Yankee) Brigade Combat Team. Reassigned to the 42d Infantry Division in 2005, in 2006 it was relieved from assignment to the 42d and reorganized and redesignated as the 26th Maneuver Enhancement Brigade.

Honors
The division received six campaign streamers in World War I and four campaign streamers in World War II, for a total of 10 campaign streamers in its operational lifetime.

Campaign streamers

Commanders

Legacy 
The beltway around the city of Boston, Massachusetts Route 128, is nicknamed the "Yankee Division Highway" in honor of the 26th Infantry Division. For its contribution in liberating the Gusen concentration camp, the United States Holocaust Memorial Museum continually flies the division's colors at its entrance and for high-profile memorial ceremonies, honoring it as one of 35 US divisions to have assisted in the liberation of German concentration camps.

Notable members of the division include Walter Krueger, Edward Lawrence Logan, J. Laurence Moffitt, the last surviving veteran of the Yankee Division from World War I, and Sergeant Stubby, a dog that served with the division in combat in World War I. PFC Michael J. Perkins, a resident of South Boston and a member of the division was awarded the Medal of Honor in France in World War I.  PFC George Dilboy of Company H, 103d Infantry was awarded the Medal of Honor for actions against a German machine-gun emplacement in which he was mortally wounded near the Bouresches railroad station on 18 July 1918. Additionally, two members of the division received the Medal of Honor in World War II, Ruben Rivers, and Alfred L. Wilson. Architecture student Victor Lundy was transferred into the 26th in 1944; he produced sketches documenting people, places and scenes that open a window into life in the division between May and November 1944. Lundy donated the surviving sketches to the Library of Congress in 2009, and the collection is accessible online.

References

Sources

External links

26th Infantry Division "Yankee Division" World War II Historical Re-enactment Group
26th Yankee Division Veterans Association
26th Yankee Division Band
Brief History of the 26th Division in Pictures

026th Infantry Division, U.S.
Infantry Division, U.S. 026th
United States Army divisions of World War I
Divisions of the United States Army National Guard
Military units and formations established in 1917
Military units and formations in Massachusetts
Military units and formations in Maine
Military units and formations in New Hampshire
Military units and formations in Rhode Island
Military units and formations in Vermont
Military units and formations in Connecticut
Military in Connecticut
Infantry divisions of the United States Army in World War II
Connecticut National Guard
Military units and formations disestablished in 1993
1917 establishments in Massachusetts